William Hargreaves Thompson (7 September 1876 – 22 December 1965) was an Australian rules footballer who played with Fitzroy in the Victorian Football League (VFL).

Family
The son of John Edward Thompson and Jane Smith Thompson, née Ingram, William Hargreaves Thompson was born in Prahran on 7 September 1876.

He married Jessie Helen Adams in 1918: they had two children.

Death
He died on 22 December 1965.

Footnotes

Sources
Holmesby, Russell & Main, Jim (2009). The Encyclopedia of AFL Footballers. 8th ed. Melbourne: Bas Publishing.

External links

Australian rules footballers from Melbourne
Fitzroy Football Club players
1876 births
1965 deaths
People from Prahran, Victoria